Greenvale railway line is in northern Queensland, Australia.

History 
Construction commenced in 1972 of a branch line from the North Coast railway line at Cobarra, north of Townsville. It featured 5 tunnels through the Hervey Range. It was opened in 1974 and operated until 1992 when the mine ran out of ore. Ore was then shipped from New Caledonia to the port of Townsville and railed from there to Yabulu until the refinery closed in 2016.

Proposals were made to try to retain part of the line as a tourist route but nothing came of it. In mid-2000 the railway tracks were removed but other infrastructure such as tunnels and easements remain. The track has been for walking, mountain biking and four-wheel-driving and there have been proposals to formalise this use, but collapses of tunnels along the route have raised safety issues.

Route 
The route from the mine to the refinery was:

References 

Railway lines in Queensland